The 2019–20 Chattanooga Mocs women's basketball team represented the University of Tennessee at Chattanooga during the 2019–20 NCAA Division I women's basketball season. The Mocs, led by first-year head coach Katie Burrows, played their home games at the McKenzie Arena as members of the Southern Conference (SoCon). The Mocs finished the season 11–18, 10–4 in third place in the SoCon, losing to Mercer in the first round of the conference tournament.

Previous season
The 2018–19 Chattanooga Mocs women's basketball team represented the University of Tennessee at Chattanooga during the 2018–19 NCAA Division I women's basketball season. The Mocs, led by first-year head coach Katie Burrows, played their home games at the McKenzie Arena as members of the Southern Conference (SoCon). The Mocs finished the season 14–17, 8–6 in third place in the SoCon, losing to Furman in the quarterfinals of the conference tournament.

Schedule
 
|-
!colspan=9 style="background:#00386B; color:#E0AA0F;"| Exhibition
|-

|-
!colspan=9 style="background:#00386B; color:#E0AA0F;"| Non-Conference Regular Season
|-

|-
!colspan=9 style="background:#00386B; color:#E0AA0F;"| SoCon Regular Season
|-

|-
!colspan=9 style="background:#00386B; color:#E0AA0F;"| SoCon Tournament

References

Chattanooga Mocs women's basketball seasons
Chattanooga
Chattanooga Mocs
Chattanooga Mocs